Lipothrixviridae is a family of viruses in the order Ligamenvirales. Thermophilic archaea in the phylum Thermoproteota serve as natural hosts. There are 11 species in this family, assigned to 4 genera. The genus

Taxonomy
The following genera and species are assigned to the family:
 Alphalipothrixvirus
 Alphalipothrixvirus SBFV2
 Alphalipothrixvirus SFV1
 Betalipothrixvirus
 Acidianus filamentous virus 3
 Acidianus filamentous virus 6
 Acidianus filamentous virus 7
 Acidianus filamentous virus 8
 Acidianus filamentous virus 9
 Sulfolobus islandicus filamentous virus
 Deltalipothrixvirus
 Acidianus filamentous virus 2
 Deltalipothrixvirus SBFV3

The family consists of three genera: Alphalipothrixvirus, Betalipothrixvirus, and Deltalipothrixvirus. Captovirus used to be in this family as the genus Gammalipothrixvirus, but now it is the only genus in the family Ungulaviridae. They are classified into genera based on their genomic properties and on the diversity of their terminal appendages, which are involved in host cell recognition. The originally proposed genus Alphalipothrixvirus was renamed Alphatristromavirus and moved to family Tristromaviridae. In 2020, the genus Alphalipothrixvirus was recreated for classification of Sulfolobus filamentous virus 1 and Sulfolobales Beppu filamentous virus 2.

In the genus Gammalipothrixvirus claw-like structures are found at either end of the virion.

Members of the Lipothrixviridae share structural and genomic characteristics with viruses from the Rudiviridae family, which contains non-enveloped rod-shaped viruses. Viruses from the two families have linear dsDNA genomes and share up to nine genes. In addition, the filamentous particles of rudiviruses and lipothrixviruses are built from structurally similar, homologous major capsid proteins. Due to these shared properties viruses from the two families are classified into an order Ligamenvirales.

Members of the Ligamenvirales are structurally related to viruses of the family Tristromaviridae which, similar to lipothrixviruses, are enveloped and encode two paralogous major capsid proteins with the same fold as those of ligamenviruses. Due to these structural similarities, order Ligamenvirales and family Tristromaviridae were proposed to be unified within a class 'Tokiviricetes' (toki means ‘thread’ in Georgian and viricetes is an official suffix for a virus class).

Virology
The viruses are enveloped and filamentous. The capsid varies considerably in length – 410–1950 nanometers (nm) – and is 24–38 nm in diameter. The envelope has a monolayer structure and includes di-phytanyl tetraethers lipids.

From either end of the viron are protrusions extending from the core through the envelope. The capsid itself is elongated and exhibits helical symmetry. The core itself is helical.

There are two major capsid proteins (MCP1 and MCP2). MCP1 and MCP2 form a heterodimer, which wraps around the linear dsDNA genome transforming it into A-form. Interaction between the genome and the MCPs leads to condensation of the genome into the virion superhelix. Genomes are linear, up to 40 kb in length.

Life cycle
Viral replication is cytoplasmic. Entry into the host cell is achieved by adsorption to the host cell. Acidianus filamentous virus 1 was found to bind to cellular pili-like appendages. DNA templated transcription is the method of transcription. Archaea serve as the natural host. Transmission routes are passive diffusion.

Virion assembly and egress have been studied in the case of Sulfolobus islandicus filamentous virus (SIFV). The virions assemble inside the cell. Binding of the major capsid protein dimers to the linear dsDNA genome lead to the assembly of nucleocapsids, which are subsequently enveloped intracellularly through an unknown mechanism. All lipothrixviruses are likely to be lytic viruses. In the case of betalipothrixviruses and deltalipothrixviruses, virions are released through pyramidal portals, referred to as virus-associated pyramids (VAPs). The VAPs of SIFV have a hexagonal base (i.e., constructed from six triangular facets).

References

External links
 Viralzone: Lipothrixviridae

 
Virus families